Gopi Mohun Deb (1798-1847) was one of scions the Shovabazar Raj family, a noted philanthropist educationist and foremost leader of Calcutta's Hindu society.

He was son of Ram Sundar Deb and was later adopted by his uncle  Raja Naba Krishna Deb. Raja Naba Krishan later had a son from his marriage in later life named, Rajkrishna Deb (Raja Bahadur), with whom Gopi Mohun shared the affairs of Sovabazar Estate, jointly.

Gopi Mohan was a noted Persian scholar and one of the first five founder members and Directors of the Hindu College along with David Hare and others. He was given title of Raja Bahadur by British and was generally referred to as Raja Gopi Mohun Deb.

He was the founder of famous Dharma Sabha, a conservative Hindu religious body, which spoke on views and rights of Hindus.

His son Raja Radhakanta Deb was also a noted a scholar and a leader of the Calcutta Hindu society.

References

See also
Shobhabazar Rajbari

1798 births
1847 deaths
19th-century Indian scholars
19th-century Hindu religious leaders
Bengali Hindus
Founders of Indian schools and colleges
Bengali zamindars
Scholars from Kolkata
19th-century Indian philanthropists